Howard Gilbert "Dutch" Webber was a professional American football player who played running back for four seasons for the Kansas City Blues Cowboys, Cleveland Bulldogs, Hartford Blues, New York Giants, Green Bay Packers, Newark Tornadoes, and Providence Steam Roller.

1901 births
1985 deaths
Players of American football from Nebraska
American football running backs
Cleveland Bulldogs players
Hartford Blues players
New York Giants players
Green Bay Packers players
Providence Steam Roller players
Kansas State Wildcats football players
People from Oxford, Nebraska